Satino may refer to:

Satino, Tambov Oblast, a village (selo) in Tambov Oblast, Russia
Satino, Tver Oblast, a village in Tver Oblast, Russia
Satino, name of several other rural localities in Russia